Brice Mackaya (born 23 July 1968) is a Gabonese former professional footballer who played as a forward.

References

1968 births
Living people
Gabonese footballers
Association football forwards
Gabon international footballers
1994 African Cup of Nations players
1996 African Cup of Nations players
Petrosport F.C. players
Vác FC players
Vasas SC players
Gabonese expatriate footballers
Expatriate footballers in Hungary
Gabonese expatriate sportspeople in Hungary
21st-century Gabonese people